Rasoul Khrovash (born 30 January 1953 in Isfahan) is a retired Iranian football midfielder. He is currently the team manager at Sepahan. He is graduated from the University of Texas in sports and before this, he was graduated from Isfahan University in geographical. He is the brother of Mostafa Khorvash and cousin of Shokrallah Khorvash, the founder of Sepahan.

Playing career
Khorvash is one of the former players of Sepahan which he began his football career at the age of 8 in Sepahan academy and was promoted to the first team when he was 16. He was retired in 1984 when playing for Sepahan. His usual post was left midfielder.

After retirement
He was appointed as team manager of Sepahan on 9 November 2011.

References

1953 births
Living people
Iranian footballers
Association football midfielders
Sepahan S.C. footballers